The Worst or Worst may refer to:

 The Worst, a 1997 album by Sarcófago, or its title track
 The Worst, a 2000 album by Tech N9ne, or its title track
 The Worst, a 2004 EP by Lower Class Brats, or its title track

 "The Worst" (Onyx and Wu-Tang Clan song), 1998
 "The Worst" (Jhené Aiko song), 2014
 "The Worst", a song by the Rolling Stones from the album Voodoo Lounge, 1994

 Worst (manga), a 2002 Japanese delinquent manga series by Hiroshi Takahashi
 "Worst (I Assume)", a song by JoJo from her 2021 album Trying Not to Think About It

 John H. Worst (1850–1945), Lieutenant Governor of North Dakota

See also

 Worster (surname)
 
 
 
 Worst-case scenario (disambiguation)
 Worse (disambiguation)